Jamboree in the Hills was an annual festival of country music in Morristown, Ohio (about 1½ hours west of Pittsburgh, and 20 minutes west of Wheeling, West Virginia) in Belmont County, Ohio until Live Nation officially canceled it on November 7th, 2018. The concert, owned by Live Nation, showcased a wide variety of new, veteran, and legendary musicians.

In November 2018, Live Nation announced that the Jamboree in the Hills would be going on hiatus and would not take place in 2019 as it began negotiations regarding the event's future. Local officials in Belmont County noted that the site was atypical of Live Nation's other concerts and that the event's BYOB policy deprived Live Nation of a major source of revenue. Live Nation had attempted to end the BYOB policy for the 2017 event, which was to be renamed "Jambo Country," but fan backlash led to the reversal of the decision and renaming within days of its announcement.

References

External links 
Official website

Country music festivals in the United States
Music festivals in Ohio
Music festivals established in 1977
Music festivals disestablished in 2018